Newport is a city in and the county seat of Pend Oreille County, Washington, United States. The population was 2,126 at the 2010 census.

History
Newport was given its name in 1890 because it was selected as a landing site for the first steamboat on the Pend Oreille River.  Newport was officially incorporated on April 13, 1903. The first river bridge was built in 1906, and was replaced in 1926, and again in 1988.

On July 14, 2015, an explosion took place at Zodiac Aerospace.  Five people were injured, and people were urged to stay at least 2000 feet from the facility.

One of the most important historic buildings is "Kelly's Bar and Grill" which has been operating since 1894 with only minor breaks, making it the second oldest bar in the state.

Newport began a tourism campaign in 1987 that involved planting hundreds of national, state, and city flags to transform itself into the "City of Flags". The scheme was abandoned a decade later after issues with theft and maintenance.

Geography
Newport is located at  (48.180634, -117.047407) at an elevation of 2,160 feet (658.5 m).

The town of Oldtown, Idaho, is just to the east of Newport, and on the Pend Oreille River. There are no natural or physical barriers between the two towns, and it is strictly a political division, separated by the straight-line state boundary.

About one-half mile north of Newport, the Pend Oreille River enters Washington State and flows north to Canada. The watershed of the Pend Oreille in the Newport-Oldtown area west of the river is extremely limited. Unable to flow uphill, the waters (from natural springs, rainfall runoff, etc.) eventually form the Little Spokane River, and flow southwest towards Spokane.

Demographics

2010 census
As of the census of 2010, there were 2,126 people, 874 households, and 506 families living in the city. The racial makeup of the city was 92.3% White, 0.3% African American, 1.0% Native American, 1.1% Asian, 0.4% Pacific Islander, 1.2% from other races, and 3.7% from two or more races. Hispanic or Latino of any race were 4.5% of the population.

There were 874 households, of which 34.0% had children under the age of 18 living with them, 35.7% were married couples living together, 17.6% had a female householder with no husband present, 4.6% had a male householder with no wife present, and 42.1% were non-families. 38.4% of all households were made up of individuals, and 18.9% had someone living alone who was 65 years of age or older. The average household size was 2.32 and the average family size was 3.04.

The median age in the city was 38.8 years. 27.6% of residents were under the age of 18; 7.6% were between the ages of 18 and 24; 21.4% were from 25 to 44; 22.7% were from 45 to 64; and 20.7% were 65 years of age or older. The gender makeup of the city was 46.6% male and 53.4% female.

2000 census
As of the census of 2000, there were 1,921 people, 760 households, and 471 families living in the city. The population density was 1,814.7 people per square mile (699.7/km2). There were 820 housing units at an average density of 774.6 per square mile (298.7/km2). The racial makeup of the city was 94.64% White, 0.57% Native American, 0.88% Asian, 0.10% Pacific Islander, 1.15% from other races, and 2.65% from two or more races. Hispanic or Latino of any race were 2.97% of the population.

There were 760 households, out of which 32.5% had children under the age of 18 living with them, 41.8% were married couples living together, 15.3% had a female householder with no husband present, and 37.9% were non-families. 33.4% of all households were made up of individuals, and 18.2% had someone living alone who was 65 years of age or older. The average household size was 2.42 and the average family size was 3.09.

In the city, the population was spread out, with 29.1% under the age of 18, 8.5% from 18 to 24, 23.8% from 25 to 44, 20.1% from 45 to 64, and 18.4% who were 65 years of age or older. The median age was 37 years. For every 100 females, there were 86.0 males. For every 100 females age 18 and over, there were 80.9 males.

The median income for a household in the city was $25,709, and the median income for a family was $30,898. Males had a median income of $31,597 versus $20,469 for females. The per capita income for the city was $13,900. About 22.0% of families and 23.6% of the population were below the poverty line, including 34.4% of those under age 18 and 12.5% of those age 65 or over.

Climate
Newport experiences a humid continental climate (Köppen Dsb/Dfb) with cold, moist winters and warm, drier summers. Compared to Spokane (the largest city in the area), on average, summer and winter temperatures are cooler at night, but very slightly warmer in daytime. The precipitation, however, is substantially heavier than Spokane, and snow depth during winter typically three-and-half times as high at around  versus Spokane's .

<div style="width: 75%;">

Education
Newport School District operates public schools.

References

Cities in Washington (state)
Cities in Pend Oreille County, Washington
County seats in Washington (state)